Lamprocystis misella is a species of small air-breathing land snails, terrestrial pulmonate gastropod mollusks in the family Euconulidae, the hive snails. 

This species is endemic to Guam.

References

 Mollusc Specialist Group 1996.  Lamprocystis misella.   2006 IUCN Red List of Threatened Species.   Downloaded on 7 August 2007.
 Baker, H. B. (1938). Zonitid snails from Pacific Islands. Part 1. Southern genera of Microcystinae. Bernice P. Bishop Museum bulletin. 158: 1-102, 20 pls. page(s): 89 
 Benthem Jutting, W. S. S. van. (1964). Non-marine Mollusca of West New Guinea. Nova Guinea, Zoology. 26: 1-74

Fauna of Guam
Lamprocystis